Desi (Hindustani: دیسی/देसी; Bangla: দেশী)(also Deshi ;) is a word used to describe the people, cultures, and products of the Indian subcontinent and their diaspora, derived from Sanskrit देश (deśá), meaning "land, country". Deshi traces its origin specifically to the people of the countries India, Pakistan, and Bangladesh.

Etymology
The ethnonym belongs in the endonymic category (i.e., it is a self-appellation). Deshi is borrowed from the Hindustani desī (/), 'national', ultimately from Sanskrit , derived from  'region, province, country'. The first known usage of the Sanskrit word is found in the Natya Shastra (~200 BCE), where it defines the regional varieties of folk performing arts, as opposed to the classical, pan-Indian margi. Thus,  refers to one's own country or homeland, while  refers to another's country or a foreign land.

History
The word "Desi" comes from the Sanskrit word "Desh" meaning "country". The word "Desi" is used to refer to something "from the country" and with time its usage shifted more towards referring to people, cultures, and products of a specific region; for example, desi food, desi calendars, and desi dress.

Desi contrasts with the Hindustani language word vilāyati (Anglicised as "Blighty"), which originally referred to Afghanistan and Central Asia, over time it came to refer to Britain (during the British rule vilāyat, an Arabic-origin word meaning 'state', signified Britain) but may also refer more generally to anything that is European or Western. People from the subcontinent living in vilāyat (Britain) or in other Western countries refer to themselves and their ethnic culture as desi. The desi/vilāyati pair of antonyms is widely used in subcontinent languages (Hindi, Urdu, Punjabi, Bengali, etc.).

After the passage of the Immigration and Nationality Act of 1965, the United States dramatically increased immigration from the subcontinent. For example, all things Indian including Indian expatriates were referred to as "desi".

Culture

In the U.S., as in other countries, some diaspora desis are creating a "fusion" culture, in which foods, fashions, music, and the like from many areas of South Asia are "fused" both with each other and with elements from Western culture.  For example, urban desi is a genre of music formed by the fusion of traditional Indian and Western urban music. The growing demand of popular programming for South Asians caused MTV to launch the desi-targeted television channel MTV Desi.

In the UK, desi communities have continued the fusion culture which first emerged during the rule of the British Raj, influencing music, art, fashion and food. There are now dedicated radio stations catering to British-South Asians such as the BBC Asian Network.

In Canada, desis have established sizable ethnic enclaves in areas such as Brampton, Ontario (suburban Toronto) and Surrey, British Columbia (suburban Vancouver).

Performing arts
The Natya Shastra refers to the regional varieties of folk dance and music elements as desi, and states that these are meant as pure entertainment for common people, while the pan-Indian margi elements are to spiritually enlighten the audience. The medieval developments of the classical Indian dance and music led to the introduction of desi gharanas, in addition to the classical gharanas codified in Natya Shastra. The desi gharanas further developed into the present-day adavus. There is raga in Indian classical music known as "Desi".

Food and drink

In regions of South Asia, desi in the context of food, implies "native" or "traditional". Common examples are "desi ghee", which is the traditional clarified butter used in South Asia as opposed to more processed fats such as vegetable oils. "Desi chicken" may mean a native breed of chicken. This word is also usually restricted to Sanskrit-derived (Indo-Aryan) languages.

Heritage varieties of vegetables and other produce can also be qualified as "desi". "Desi diet" refers to a diet and food choices followed by Indians around the world. Desi daru refers to "country liquor", such as fenny, toddy and arrack. It is differentiated from Indian-made foreign liquor such as Indian-made whisky, rum, or vodka.

Desi pubs

In the United Kingdom, the term Desi pub is used to describe a pub which is owned or managed by an Indian landlord, or which serves Punjabi food. They developed during the 1960s and 1970s at a time when some British pubs enforced color bars to prevent Indians and other immigrants from drinking there. Desi pubs are especially common in the Black Country and surrounding areas of the West Midlands. As well as drinking places, they also act as community hubs and meeting places for people from different backgrounds and are considered to be an example of successful integration of Indian immigrants into British culture.

See also 
Ganga-Jamuni tehzeeb
Little Bangladesh
Little India
Little Pakistan
South Asian Heritage Month

Notes

References

Culture of Indian diaspora
Culture of Pakistani diaspora
Desi culture
Emigrants
Ethnonyms
Hindi words and phrases
Indian culture
Indian slang
Pakistani culture
Pakistani slang
South Asia
Urdu-language words and phrases
Bengali culture
Bengali words and phrases